The 1960 Central Michigan Chippewas football team represented Central Michigan University in the Interstate Intercollegiate Athletic Conference (IIAC) during the 1960 NCAA College Division football season.  In their 10th season under head coach Kenneth Kelly, the Chippewas compiled a 3–5 record (3–3 against IIAC opponents) and were outscored by their opponents by a combined total of 165 to 161.

The team's statistical leaders included Wally Sadosty with 531 passing yards, Bob Fisher with 492 rushing yards, and Len Jagello with 150 receiving yards. Fisher received the team's most valuable player award. Two Central Michigan players (defensive backs Frank Gawkowski and Jerry O'Neil) received first-team honors on the All-IIAC team.

Schedule

References

Central Michigan
Central Michigan Chippewas football seasons
Central Michigan Chippewas football